Pınarbaşı is a  village in Erdemli district of Mersin Province, Turkey. It is almost merged to Elvanlı, another village to the south. The population of Pınarbaşı is 997 as of 2012. . The village was founded in 1865 as a result of Ottoman policy of Turkmen emplacement. Former name of the village was Çakalkeşli. In 1954, a neighbourhood was issued from the village  and the village was named as Pınarbaşı referring to water resources of the village. The village economy depends on fresh water fishing and citrus farming.

References

Villages in Erdemli District